Prather is an unincorporated community in Clark County, Indiana, in the United States.

History
A post office was established at Prather in 1878, and remained in operation until it was discontinued in 1933. Prather was the name of a family who kept a shop.

References

Unincorporated communities in Clark County, Indiana
Unincorporated communities in Indiana